Christopher James Ikonomidis (born 4 May 1995) is an Australian professional footballer who plays as an attacking midfielder or as a winger for Melbourne Victory and the Australia national team.

He is notable in being capped by his senior national team despite not yet having played a single senior game at club level at the time.

Club career

Early career
Ikonomidis came from a family who had always played football, started playing himself when he was four years old in Sydney at local team Cronulla RSL. He played youth football for NPL NSW side Sutherland Sharks. In 2010, he was part of the team that won the Oceania zone of the Manchester United Premier Cup, qualifying for the finals in England. His performance in England, including four goals in a 7–0 defeat of a Wigan Athletic youth side.

After scoring several goals on trial with Italian club Atalanta, including one against Chelsea, Ikonomidis was offered a youth contract on his 16th birthday.

Lazio
In 2013, after 18 months at Atalanta, Ikonomidis was offered a three-year youth contract by Lazio. After strong performances with Lazio's Primavera squad, Ikonomidis made his senior debut for Lazio on 10 December 2015 starting in the final Group Stage match of the 2015–16 UEFA Europa League against AS Saint-Étienne. Ikonomidis signed a new contract on 5 June 2015.

Loan to Salernitana
For the second half of the 2015–16 season, Lazio loaned Ikonomidis to Salernitana from the Serie B. He made his Serie B debut for Salernitana on 22 January 2016, playing the full match at home to Brescia, where his cross led to a Brescia own goal.

Loan to AGF
On 31 August 2016, Ikonomidis joined AGF in the Danish Superliga on a season-long loan in a bid for regular game time. He made his debut on 12 September 2016, coming on as a 66th minute substitute in a 3–1 victory over Nordsjælland. He had a good season at AGF, but AGF announced that Ikonomidis was one out of five players that wouldn't continue at the club for the 2017–18 season.

Loan to Western Sydney Wanderers
On 31 January 2018, Ikonomidis joined A-League club Western Sydney Wanderers on loan until the end of the season. At the end of the season he returned to Lazio.

Perth Glory
On 11 September 2018, Ikonomidis signed a three-year contract with Perth Glory.

Melbourne Victory
On 21 July 2021, Ikonmoidis signed a three-year marquee contract with Melbourne Victory.

International career
Ikonomidis is of Greek heritage and was eligible for senior call-ups to both the Australia national team and the Greece national team. He turned down Greece in favour of Australia, being quoted in 2013 saying "I was approached by the Greek federation 12 months ago, but I said no. I am 100 per cent playing for Australia if given the chance".

In 2013, he was called up by Paul Okon to the Australian U20's for the COTIF Tournament in Valencia, and again in the 2014 AFC U-19 Championship, where he played one game against the UAE. He was also called up to the Olyroos for the 2013 AFC U-22 Championship in Oman (which was actually held in 2014), where he played against Kuwait and Japan.

On 11 March 2015, Socceroos coach Ange Postecoglou named Ikonomidis in the senior squad for friendlies against reigning World Champion Germany and Macedonia to be held that month. He was substituted on replacing Nathan Burns in the game against Macedonia in Skopje on 30 March to earn his first senior Socceroos cap. His competitive debut for the Socceroos came on 3 September 2015 during 2018 FIFA World Cup qualification, when he was substituted on in the 61st minute during Australia's 5–0 win over Bangladesh at Perth Oval.

Ikonomidis was named in the Olyroos squad for the 2016 AFC U-23 Championship, although he was recalled later from the camp by Lazio for his loan to Salernitana.

On 30 December 2018, Ikonomidis scored his first international goal for Australia against Oman in an international friendly in the UAE. Ikonomidis scored off a cross by Awer Mabil from within the box.

Career statistics

Club

International

Scores and results list Australia's goal tally first, score column indicates score after each Ikonomidis goal.

Honours
Lazio
 Coppa Italia Primavera: 2013–14, 2014–15
 Supercoppa Primavera: 2014

Perth Glory
 A-League Premiership: 2018–19

Melbourne Victory
 FFA Cup: 2021

Individual
 A-League Young Footballer of the Year: 2018–19
 PFA A-League Team of the Season: 2018–19

References

External links

1995 births
Living people
Australian people of Greek descent
Soccer players from Sydney
Australian soccer players
Association football midfielders
Australia international soccer players
Australia youth international soccer players
Australia under-20 international soccer players
2019 AFC Asian Cup players
Serie B players
A-League Men players
Marquee players (A-League Men)
Danish Superliga players
S.S. Lazio players
U.S. Salernitana 1919 players
Aarhus Gymnastikforening players
Western Sydney Wanderers FC players
Perth Glory FC players
Melbourne Victory FC players
Australian expatriate soccer players
Australian expatriate sportspeople in Italy
Expatriate footballers in Italy